Georges Gorse (15 February 1915 – 17 March 2002) was a French politician and diplomat.

Born in Cahors, he qualified in 1939 as a professor at the University of Cairo. During World War II he joined Charles de Gaulle and the Free French as Director of Information, served on the Provisional Consultative Assembly.
After the war he was elected to represent the Vendée in the French National Assembly from 1946 to 1951, and then the Section Française de l'Internationale Ouvrière (SFIO) from 1951 onwards. In 1957, Guy Mollet made him an Ambassador to Algeria, then he was elected as Gaullist representative which he held from 1967 to 1997. 

During the events of May 1968, having attended a private political meeting as Minister of Information, he broke the news to the French media of de Gaulle's now notorious statement "reform yes, but 'chienlit, no". 

Gorse held a wide range of positions of state:

 Under-secretary of State for Muslim Affairs 1946 to 1947 
 Under-secretary of State for Foreign Affairs 1949 to 1950 
 Secretary of State for Foreign Affairs, 1961 to 1962 
 Secretary of State for Foreign Affairs, 1962 
 Minister for Co-operation, 1962 
 Ambassador to Algeria, 1963 to 1967 
 Minister of Labour, 1973 to 1974 
 Mayor of Boulogne-Billancourt, 1971 to 1991

Bibliography
 Georges Gorse – Autobiography, "Je n'irai pas à mon enterrement" ("I will not go to my burial"). published 1992

1915 births
2002 deaths
People from Cahors
Mayors of places in Île-de-France
Politicians from Occitania (administrative region)
French Section of the Workers' International politicians
Union for the New Republic politicians
Union of Democrats for the Republic politicians
Rally for the Republic politicians
Ministers of Information of France
Government ministers of France
Members of the Constituent Assembly of France (1945)
Members of the Constituent Assembly of France (1946)
Deputies of the 1st National Assembly of the French Fourth Republic
Deputies of the 1st National Assembly of the French Fifth Republic
Deputies of the 3rd National Assembly of the French Fifth Republic
Deputies of the 4th National Assembly of the French Fifth Republic
Deputies of the 5th National Assembly of the French Fifth Republic
Deputies of the 6th National Assembly of the French Fifth Republic
Deputies of the 7th National Assembly of the French Fifth Republic
Deputies of the 8th National Assembly of the French Fifth Republic
Deputies of the 9th National Assembly of the French Fifth Republic
Deputies of the 10th National Assembly of the French Fifth Republic
Ambassadors of France to Algeria
École Normale Supérieure alumni
World War II political leaders
French people of World War II
French expatriates in Egypt